Christianah Oluwatoyin Oluwasesin (first name also given as Christiana, last name also as Oluwaseesin, Oluseesin or Olusesan),  (Ekiti State, 1977 – Gandu, Gombe State, 21 March 2007), was a  Christian Nigerian teacher who was lynched by Yan Kalare  boys for allegedly desecrating and mutilating  the Qur'an at a secondary school in Gandu, Gombe State, Nigeria, on March 21, 2007.

Oluwasesin, a mother of two, was assigned to supervise an Islamic religious knowledge exam. When one of the students wanted to enter the exam hall with his books, Oluwasesin collected them and threw them outside. The students claimed that one of the books was a copy of the Qur'an. This caught the attention of the popular thugs (Yan Kalare), who stabbed her to death. They then beat up the school principal, a Muslim, who later escaped the crowd for offering refuge to her. They then burned down three classroom blocks, the school clinic, the administrative block and the library.

Reprisals

Gombe State Governor Mohammed Danjuma Goje ordered the immediate closure of all secondary schools in the state and the deployment of soldiers and policemen to strategic points in the state, especially churches.  Three people were arrested in connection with the murder. They were arraigned before the Federal High Court, Gombe, which had not yet delivered judgment on the matter in March 2008.

References

External links

1977 births
2007 deaths
Yoruba educators
People from Ekiti State
Nigerian Christians
Nigerian schoolteachers
Nigerian murder victims
Lynching deaths
Persecution of Christians by Muslims
Victims of anti-Christian violence
Religiously motivated violence in Nigeria
Violence against women in Nigeria
Nigerian women educators
Female murder victims
2007 murders in Nigeria